Nagroda Wielka Warszawska is a polish horse race.

History 
Nagroda Wielka Warszawska was held for the first time in 1895, modeled on the French Grand Prix de Paris race. This race was won by Aschabad, one of Ruler's most outstanding sons. The race was immediately highly subsidized and recognized as the most important comparative race of the season. Until 1904, it had a distance of about 3,200 m. For political reasons, in the years 1905-1912, 1915–1916 and 1919, there were breaks in its play. In 1913 and in 1917 and 1918 (in Odessa) it was held over a distance of 2,667 m. From 1920, its distance was 2,800 m, and from 1933 - 2,400 m, the same as after World War II in 1946-48 . The current distance (2600 m) has remained unchanged since 1949.

Records

Speed record 

 2:40,3 - Intens (2011)

Most wins 

 2 - Madame Ferrari (1901, 1902)
 2 - Jawor II (1933, 1934)
 2 - Turysta (1947, 1948)
 2 - Demona (1964, 1965)
 2 - Erotyk (1968, 1969)
 2 - Kliwia (1991, 1992)
 2 - San Luis (2004, 2005)
 2 - Night Tornado (2021, 2022)

Most wins by a jockey 

 8 - Jerzy Jednaszewski (1957, 1959, 1960, 1962, 1967, 1970, 1973, 1977)
 4 - Mieczysław Mełnicki (1964, 1965, 1981, 1986)
 4 - Jerzy Ochocki (1985, 1987, 1988, 2006)
 4 - Janusz Kozłowski (1983, 1989, 1991, 1992)

Most wins by a trainer 

 10 - Andrzej Walicki (1971, 1974, 1986, 1989, 1991, 1992, 2004, 2005, 2013, 2014)
 7 - Stanisław Molenda (1967, 1968, 1969, 1970, 1973, 1975, 1977)

Winners

References 

Horse racing in Poland
Horse racing